Crackers Neck was an unincorporated community in  Pulaski County, Kentucky, United States.

References

Unincorporated communities in Pulaski County, Kentucky
Unincorporated communities in Kentucky